Raphael Cormack is a British writer and scholar of the Arab world. He obtained his PhD in Egyptian theatre from the University of Edinburgh. He has also been a visiting researcher at Columbia University. He has written essays on Arab culture in outlets such as the LRB, Prospect and the TLS. He has also edited two anthologies titled The Book of Cairo and The Book of Khartoum.

Cormack is the author of Midnight in Cairo: The Female Stars of Egypt’s Roaring ’20s, an exploration of Cairo popular culture through personalities such as Rose Al-Youssef, Mounira al-Mahdiyya and Oum Kalthoum

He is the son of Robin Cormack and historian Mary Beard. He is married to Pamela Takefman.

References

British historians
Year of birth missing (living people)
Living people
Alumni of the University of Edinburgh